Marcio Alves dos Santos (born February 2, 1990), known as Tele, is a Brazilian football player.

Club statistics

References

External links

1990 births
Living people
Brazilian footballers
J1 League players
J2 League players
Japan Football League players
Hokkaido Consadole Sapporo players
FC Machida Zelvia players
Brazilian expatriate footballers
Expatriate footballers in Japan
Association football forwards